Piñata is a 2005 Australian computer-animated short film, produced by Act3animation in Australia, released in 2005. It received funding from the Australian Film Commission. It has screened at various festivals around the world, including the Annecy International Animation Festival and SIGGRAPH, both in 2005, and for the first time in Australia on free-to-air television in February 2007 on ABC2's short film series Short & Curly.

Plot summary
A piñata (voiced by Mark Mitchell) suspended from a rope on a tree, awakens as if coming to life for the first time. It hears the noise of children and wants to join them, but can not when it is tied to the tree). Soon though, a girl (voiced by Alice Hollands), with only her sombrero showing, wielding a large (but not quite large enough) stick approaches and begins swinging unsuccessfully at the piñata. Shortly, another child shows up with a stick that can reach it and the piñata, to its surprise, gets hit across the face. To its horror, more children (a group of sombreros) show up and attack it. This happens a few more times, until the piñata climbs up its rope out of their reach using its teeth. The children are dismayed, until an adult, represented by a larger sombrero, comes in with a stick large enough to reach the piñata. The adult winds up for the hit and begins shaking. The piñata also begins shaking. Just before the adult strikes, the piñata, in a great state of fear and panic, is struck by a vicious bout of diarrhea, which for a piñata is in the form of candy. The children rejoice and the piñata is relieved, since it is now left alone. But to its surprise, as the film finishes, it is attacked once more by the original little girl, who has acquired the large stick used by the adult.

Awards

Won
2005 - Vidfest.

Picked for
2005 - Annecy International Animated Film Festival
2005 - AFI Awards - Best Short Animation
2005 - Flickerfest
2005 - SIGGRAPH

References

External links
Piñata on Act3animation website

Piñata on Atomfilms
Piñata on Nice Shorts
Piñata on ABC2's Short & Curly

2005 films
2005 short films
2005 comedy films
2005 computer-animated films
2000s Australian animated films
2000s children's comedy films
2000s children's animated films
2000s English-language films
Australian animated short films
Australian computer-animated films
Australian children's comedy films
Animated films about children
Films about birthdays
Films set in Australia
Australian comedy short films